Brenthia dendronympha is a species of moth of the family Choreutidae. It was described by Edward Meyrick in 1937. It is found in India.

References 

Brenthia
Moths described in 1937